Sharanlu (also Romanized as Sharānlū) is a village in Gavdul-e Gharbi Rural District, in the Central District of Malekan County, East Azerbaijan Province, Iran. At the 2006 census, its population was 423, in 101 families.

References 

Populated places in Malekan County